In molecular biology, alpha-amylase inhibitor (or α-...) is a protein family  which inhibits mammalian alpha-amylases specifically, by forming a tight stoichiometric 1:1 complex with alpha-amylase. This family of inhibitors has no action on plant and microbial alpha amylases.

A crystal structure has been determined for tendamistat, the 74-amino acid inhibitor produced by Streptomyces tendae that targets a wide range of mammalian alpha-amylases. The binding of tendamistat to alpha-amylase leads to the steric blockage of the active site of the enzyme. The crystal structure of tendamistat revealed an immunoglobulin-like fold that could potentially adopt multiple conformations. Such molecular flexibility could enable an induced-fit type of binding that would both optimise binding and allow broad target specificity.

References

Protein domains